Daniel Joe (born 29 May 1990) is a Papua New Guinean football player. He is currently a member of Hekari United. He has made three appearances for the Papua New Guinea national football team, in 2012, 2014, and 2016.

References

Living people
1990 births
Papua New Guinean footballers
Papua New Guinea international footballers
Hekari United players
Association football defenders
Place of birth missing (living people)
2012 OFC Nations Cup players
2016 OFC Nations Cup players